Ulotrichopus phaeopera  is a moth of the  family Erebidae. It is found in Kenya and Uganda.

References

Ulotrichopus
Moths of Africa
Moths described in 1913